Brattert (Luxembourgish: Brattert) is a village in northwestern Luxembourg.

It is situated in the commune of Wahl and has a population of 24.

Gallery

References 

Villages in Luxembourg